Siri Landsem Lorentsen (born 14 June 1965) is a Norwegian sport shooter.

She was born in Trondheim. At the 1984 Summer Olympics she finished seventh in the 10 metre air rifle event and 17th in the 50 metre rifle three positions event. At the 1988 Summer Olympics she finished 36th in the 10 metre air rifle event and 37th in the 50 metre rifle three positions event.

She has her education from the Norwegian School of Sport Sciences. She resides in Hommelvik.

References

1965 births
Living people
Norwegian female sport shooters
Shooters at the 1984 Summer Olympics
Shooters at the 1988 Summer Olympics
Olympic shooters of Norway
Norwegian School of Sport Sciences alumni
Sportspeople from Trondheim